Horacio Malvicino (born 20 October 1929 in Concordia, Entre Ríos Province, Argentina) is a jazz and tango electric guitarist and composer who played for many years with the tango musician Ástor Piazzolla in several of his ensembles.

Biography
The son of Esteben Malvicino, a railway employee, Horacio grew up in Concordia where, between and ages of 6 and 14, he was taught to play the guitar by Augustin Satalia.  His teacher would only allow him to play classical music and in those days jazz was rarely heard in the city.  However,  he got to know the music of the  jazz guitarists Charlie Christian and Django Reinhardt and the jazz clarinetist Benny Goodman,  by listening to a friend’s records of these musicians.  He also listened to the tango music of Ástor Piazzolla's Orquesta Típica on Radio Splendid. 

Arriving in Buenos Aires in 1947, he studied medicine for five years until music took over his life and he became part of the bop generation centred on the Bop Club Argentino.  This venue was frequented by the Argentine jazz tenor saxophonist  Gato Barbieri, the Argentine pianist Lalo Schifrin and Rubén López Furst.  It was here that the first attempts to development modern jazz in Argentina were taking place in response to the great changes in the jazz world, initiated by the American jazz saxophonist Charlie Parker.  

By the time Piazzolla met Malvicino for the first time in 1954, improvising in the Bop Club, Malvicino had already played with several orquesta típicas of the time including those of  Fernando Roca, Eduardo Armani and Rene Cospito.  In 1955 he joined Piazzolla’s Octeto Buenos Aires which would pioneer nuevo tango, a new approach to tango, until then dominated by the traditional orquesta típicas of the 1930s and 1940s. This would mark a watershed in the history of tango and set Piazzolla on a collision course with the tango establishment.  The jazz-like improvisations of Malvicino on electric guitar in, for example, Piazzolla's 1955 composition Marron y Azul, had never been heard before in tango.

A long association with Piazzolla would see Malvicino join his first Quinteto in 1960, where he alternated with Oscar Lopez Ruiz, his Octeto Electronico in 1976, his second Quinteto in 1978 and his Sexteto Nuevo Tango in 1989.  Malvicino travelled the world with Piazzolla and his ensembles and together they recorded 15 albums.  Of the electric guitarists who played with Piazzolla, Malvicino was the one who he considered to best understood his music, and who was the most tanguero. 

From a young age, Malvicino has been an outstanding sight reader and arranger of music and has worked as musical director for the Argentine recording label, Disc Jockey, the international recording label RCA Records and for the Argentine television channel, Canal 11.  During the 1960s he formed his own ensemble, the Horacio Malvicino Jazz Quintet.  Over the years he has played various genres of music with many of the great names in the music world including Dizzy Gillespie, Gary Burton, Miles Davis, Antônio Carlos Jobim, Joao Gilberto, Susana Rinaldi, Milva, Tanguito, Los Chalchaleros, Palito Ortega, and Plácido Domingo.  He has composed music for more than 90 Argentine films and theatrical works and in 1998 was awarded first prize by SADAIC for his film music. 

Nicknamed Malveta by his friends, he has worked under 15 pseudonyms including Alain Debray (Alain after the French actor Alain Delon and Debray after the French revolutionary Régis Debray)  and  Don Nadie (Don Nobody),  typically when playing music outside the world of jazz.

He married when he was 30 to Graciela and has two sons, Marcelo and Horacio.  With a lifelong interest in horses inherited from his father, he runs his own stud farm, San Antonio, for breeding race horses. Having never completed his medical studies as a young man he still maintains an interest in the subject and attends courses from time to time. 

In 2008 Malvicino published a book entitled El Tano y Yo, where he records stories of his musical career as electric guitarist in Piazzolla’s various ensembles, and is vice-president of the Argentine Interpreters Association.

References
Ástor Piazzolla, A Memoir, Natalio Gorin, Amadaeus, 2001.
El Tano y Yo, Horacio Malvicino, Corregidor, 2008.

Argentine tango musicians
1929 births
Living people
Argentine jazz guitarists
People from Entre Ríos Province